Pic Mobert South is a First Nations reserve in Thunder Bay District, Ontario. It is one of two reserves of the Netmizaaggamig Nishnaabeg (Pic Mobert), alongside Pic Mobert North.

References

Ojibwe reserves in Ontario
Communities in Thunder Bay District